Darren "Whackhead" Simpson (born 19 April 1977) is a radio presenter working for Primedia, a broadcasting company that owns the radio stations 947 and 94.5 Kfm in South Africa (among others).

Radio career
As of Monday 2 August 2010, Simpson has been hosting 94.7's morning show Breakfast Xpress. The show was previously hosted by Jeremy Mansfield under the name The Rude Awakening. The Breakfast Xpress Team changed time slots with Anele Mdoda and the 947 Drive Team on 3 April 2017 and now runs under the name 947 Xpress Drive. In April 2017, Simpson started to host the 94.5 KFM Breakfast Show, hosting both shows for the remainder of 2017. In January 2018, Simpson left 947 in order to exclusively focus on the "KFM Breakfast Show".

Simpson's prank call slot titled Whackhead's Window on the World used to be broadcast on 947 in Johannesburg, during his tenure there, and continued onKfm Breakfast in Cape Town after his transfer there in 2017.
 His pranks are available for podcast on a daily basis by the radio stations.

Simpson has also co-starred with Mansfield on the M-Net hidden camera show, Laugh Out Loud.

Tom Cruise scam
On 27 January 2009, Simpson scammed Australia's radio breakfast duo, Kyle and Jackie O, making them believe that they were interviewing Tom Cruise about the film Valkyrie. The Australian show had ridiculed some of Simpson's pranks in the past, and he had been planning the prank for about two months. Once on air, Simpson announced that they had been scammed and congratulated the Proteas cricket team on their victory over the Australian side on the day before. The Australian station, 2Day FM, had spent approximately AUD$150 000 on advertising the interview in the preceding weeks. Simpson commented that the entire prank cost him about R 60 for the phone call.

Discography
Between 2004 and 2016, Simpson has compiled a yearly CD compilation of his pranks, as heard on 947. Following is a list of all his releases, :

 The Best of Whack Head's Prank Calls
 Released: 2004
 Number of discs: 1

 Oh My Greatness Hits!
 Released: 2005
 Number of discs: 2

 Serial Prankster
 Released: 2007-11-05
 Number of discs: 2
 This is the first album to offer bonus tracks from its official website.

 Off the Hook
 Released: 2008
 Number of discs: 2

 Thrown in the Deep End
 Released: 2009
 Number of discs: 2

 Phowned
 Released: 2010
 Number of discs: 2

 Epic Fail
 Released: 2011
 Number of discs: 2

Biography
Simpson was born on 19 April 1977, in Durban, South Africa.

On 2 February 2010, he announced his engagement to Samantha Teixeira. The wedding took place on 25 September 2010.

References

External links
 Darren Simpson, official site
 Laugh Out Loud, official site
 Podcast mp3 file of the Tom Cruise prank

South African male comedians
South African radio presenters
Living people
1978 births
People from Durban
White South African people
South African people of British descent